Croton persimilis is a species of tree in the Euphorbiaceae family. It is native to an area from Thailand in mainland Southeast Asia to southern Yunnan, China and to the Indian subcontinent. It is a pioneer species with a short life span. The plant is used in the traditional medicines of various peoples.

Description
This tree has leaves that are either coarsely dentate, serrate or crenate, prominently-lobed subglobose fruit some 10 x 8–12 mm in size, and peltate/shield-like indumentum (hair covering on the plant), with rays of scales radiating in 1 plane (at least 80% webbing, rays free of such for only some 20% of total length).

Distribution
This species is native to Mainland Southeast Asia, southern Yunnan (Zhōngguó/China) and the Indian subcontinent. Countries and regions in which it occurs include: Thailand; Cambodia; Vietnam; Zhōngguó/China (southern Yunnan); Laos, Myanmar; India (including Assam); Bangladesh; East Himalaya; Sri Lanka

Habitat and ecology
The tree is a pioneer species, with a short lifespan.

The tree is a pollen source for stingless bee species in the Lepidotrigona, Tetragonilla and Tetragonula genera at Nam Nao National Park, Phetchabun Province, northern Thailand.  
The tree occurs in bamboo-deciduous forest and deciduous dipterocarp-oak forest in the park.

In the utilized edge of montane evergreen forest of Doi Suthep–Pui National Park, Chiang Mai Province, northern Thailand, the dominant species were Glochidion lanceolarium, Litsea beusekomii, Schima wallichii, Erythrina stricta, Macaranga indica, Staphylea cochinchinensis, C.persimilis, Pinus kesiya, Litsea martabanica, and Clausena excavata.

This is a host plant for the Eriophyoidea mite Cosella crotoni in Thailand.

The plant is the most abundant tree in the peripheral zone of Kuldiha Wildlife Sanctuary, Odisha, India, it was pervasive in the buffer zone, but of far lesser presence in the core zone. These zones reflected human interference in the landscape.  
Other abundant trees in the peripheral zone were Shorea robusta, Glochidion lanceolarium, Caesalpinia digyna, Ziziphus oenoplia, Syzygium cumini and Stereospermum tetragonum. In the buffer zone, apart from C.persimilis, other abundant trees were Holarrhena pubescens, Macaranga peltata, S.robusta, Terminalia alata, and Pongamia pinnata.

Vernacular names
ទុំៃូង, thom pung are names for this species in Khmer language.
plao yai, and รากเปล้าใหญ่ are names used in Thailand for this plant.

Uses
The leaves of the species are used in Thai traditional medicine for postpartum (after childbirth) care.

The bark and leaves, at times boiled, are used to treat a variety of ailments in Na Siao subdistrict, Chaiyaphum Province, northern Thailand.

Villagers living on the plateau of Phnom Kulen National Park, Siem Reap Province, northwestern Cambodia, use dried pieces of the trunk and branches to make a "green tea" to treat stomachache, and use the wood-chips mixed with other plants in a decoction for postpartum care.

Four ethnic groups living in the Wayanad District, Kerala, India, the Kattunaikkan, Kuruchiyar, Mullakuruman, and Adiyan people, use the plant to treat inflammation.

History
The species was first described in 1865 by the Swiss botanist Johann Müller (1828–96), known in botany (because of his sharing a quite common name) as Johannes Müller Argoviensis. He specialized in lichens. The description was published in the journal Linnaea; Ein Journal für die Botanik in ihrem ganzen Umfange, (Berlin).
Justification of the broader spread of this description was published by the Indian botanists T. Chakrabarty and Nambiyath Puthansurayil Balakrishnan in their 2017 publication.

Further reading
Further information of this taxa can be found at the following sources:
Balakrishnan & Chakrabarty, 2007, The family Euphorbiaceae in India: A synopsis of its profile, taxonomy and bibliography
Chayamarit & Van Welzen, 2005, 'Euphorbiaceae', Flora of Thailand 8(1)
Govaerts, 1999, World Checklist of Seed Plants 3(1, 2a & 2b) [cites as Croton joufra]
Govaerts et al., 2000, World Checklist and Bibliography of Euphorbiaceae (and Pandaceae) [cites as Croton joufra]
Khan & Khan, 2002, 'Taxonomic and distributional notes on the species' Bangladesh Journal of Plant Taxonomy 9(1):77-80
Pasha et al., 2013, 'A taxonomic revision of Croton L. (Euphorbiaceae)', Bangladesh Journal of Economic and Taxonomic Botany 37:379-389.
Wu et al., 2008, Flora of China 11

References

persimilis
Flora of Assam (region)
Flora of Bangladesh
Flora of Cambodia
Flora of East Himalaya
Flora of India (region)
Flora of Indo-China
Flora of Sri Lanka
Flora of Yunnan
Plants described in 1865
Taxa named by Johannes Müller Argoviensis